Brenham is a city in east-central Texas in Washington County, United States, with a population of 17,369 according to the 2020 U.S. census. It is the county seat of Washington County.

Washington County is known as the "Birthplace of Texas," as it contains the site of the signing of the Texas Declaration of Independence on March 2, 1836 in the town of Washington-on-the-Brazos.  This is now a state historic site.

Brenham is also known for its annual German heritage festival that takes place each May called Maifest, similar to Volksfest. Numerous German immigrants settled here in the mid-nineteenth century, following the Revolutions in German states in 1848.
Brenham is also the Home of "The World's Largest BBQ Pit" on 290 West.

History
The area surrounding Brenham was occupied by various Native American tribes through the nineteenth century. The Brenham area was part of the Old Three Hundred, the first authorized colonization of Texas by Anglo-Americans led by Stephen F. Austin. In the 1820s and 1830s, several small communities developed in the area. In 1843, the Hickory Grove community was renamed Brenham in memory of a local physician, Richard Fox Brenham, who died while serving in the Texian militia during the Mier Expedition. On February 4, 1844, Washington County voters selected Brenham to become the county seat. German immigrants settled in Brenham as early as 1846. With the exception of the Civil War years, the German-born population of Brenham increased throughout the second half of the nineteenth century. The largest numbers of German immigrants arrived between 1880 and 1883. Jewish immigrants settled in Brenham beginning in the 1860s and established one of the first Orthodox congregations in Texas in 1885.

Geography
According to the United States Census Bureau, the city has a total area of 8.8 square miles (22.7 km2), all of it land.

Climate
The climate in this area is characterized by relatively high temperatures and evenly distributed precipitation throughout the year.   The Köppen Climate System describes the weather as humid subtropical, and uses the abbreviation Cfa.

Demographics

As of the 2020 United States census, there were 17,639 people, 6,197 households, and 3,606 families residing in the city.

As of the census of 2000, there were 13,507 people, 4,907 households, and 3,115 families residing in the city. The population density was 1,541.5 people per square mile (595.3/km2). There were 5,317 housing units at an average density of 606.8 per square mile (234.3/km2). The racial makeup of the city was 69.99% White, 21.91% African American, 0.25% Native American, 1.86% Asian, 0.01% Pacific Islander, 4.75% from other races, and 1.22% from two or more races. Hispanic or Latino of any race were 10.25% of the population.
There were 4,907 households, out of which 30.0% had children under the age of 18 living with them, 45.7% were married couples living together, 14.2% had a female householder with no husband present, and 36.5% were non-families. 30.7% of all households were made up of individuals, and 15.4% had someone living alone who was 65 years of age or older. The average household size was 2.40 and the average family size was 3.01.

In the city, the population was spread out, with 22.5% under the age of 18, 15.9% from 18 to 24, 24.7% from 25 to 44, 18.8% from 45 to 64, and 18.2% who were 65 years of age or older. The median age was 35 years. For every 100 females, there were 89.1 males. For every 100 females age 18 and over, there were 86.6 males.

The median income for a household in the city was $32,198, and the median income for a family was $41,486. Males had a median income of $31,133 versus $22,152 for females. The per capita income for the city was $15,351. About 12.8% of families and 17.7% of the population were below the poverty line, including 21.9% of those under age 18 and 20.7% of those age 65 or over.

Economy

Brenham is the home of and headquarters for Blue Bell Creameries. Blue Bell is the 4th best-selling ice cream brand in the United States, and is sold in 16 states.

Brenham is also home to a large Valmont Industries industrial plant, where metal poles are manufactured.

The city is the site of the Brenham State Supported Living Center, the largest facility in Texas for providing housing and care to intellectually disabled persons.

The Texas Department of Aging and Disability Services operates the Brenham State Supported Living Center (formerly Brenham State School).

Government

The city operates as a council–manager government - as such it elects its mayor and city council, who then appoint a city manager. The mayor is elected by the city at large, while the city council is elected per-ward. There are four wards, and each ward elects a single city council member. Two additional council members are elected from the city at large. The mayor and city council members serve 4 year terms.

Education
The City of Brenham's primary education is provided by Brenham Independent School District (Brenham ISD) and various private schools. The public schools in Brenham ISD include Brenham Elementary School, Krause Elementary School, Alton Elementary School, Brenham Middle School, Brenham Junior High School, and Brenham High School. Brenham High School's mascot is the lion cub.

The traditional role of middle school is split in two in Brenham, with 5th through 6th graders attending Brenham Middle School and 7th through 8th graders attending Brenham Junior High School. In 2022, Brenham ISD proposed a project to tear down and rebuild Brenham Junior High School to be able to handle the 6th grade through 8th grade population, then convert Brenham Middle School into a third elementary school serving students up to 5th grade, however this proposal was rejected by voters.

Blinn College, the oldest county-owned junior college in Texas, is located in Brenham. Blinn has campuses also in Bryan, Schulenburg, and Sealy.

Infrastructure
The following highways pass through Brenham:

Notable people
 Malcom Brown (born 1994), professional football player
 Timothy Brian Cole (1960–1999), The first person in Texas to receive a posthumous pardon and the first posthumous DNA Exonerated person in the United States
 Cecil Cooper (born 1949), professional baseball player
 Will Ezell (1892–1963), barrelhouse pianist
 Hosea Garrett (1800–1888), clergyman, cofounder of Baylor University
 Othello Maria Harris-Jefferson (1905–1988), professor of education, Bluefield State University
 Jack Heidemann (born 1949), professional baseball player
 Don Imus (1940–2019), radio and TV personality, recording artist and author
 Blind Willie Johnson (1897–1945), singer, songwriter, guitarist
 Lois Kolkhorst (born 1964), state politician, state representative from Brenham from 2001 to 2015, and state senator since 2015
 Roosevelt Leaks (born 1953), professional football player
 Lucas Luetge (born 1987), professional baseball pitcher
 Chuck Machemehl (born 1946), professional baseball player
 Frank Malina (1912–1981), aeronautical engineer and director of NASA's Jet Propulsion Laboratory, entrepreneur, rocket researcher, artist
 Louise Martin (1914–1955), photographer
 Teaira McCowan (born 1996), WNBA, plays for Dallas Wings
 Roger Metzger, professional baseball player, Houston Astros
 Paul Pressler (born 1930), retired judge from Houston; owns Hidden Hills Ranch near Brenham
 Luke Sanders (born 1985), UFC fighter
 Austin Schlottmann (born 1995), professional football player (Denver Broncos 2018–current)
 Ricky Seilheimer (born 1960), professional baseball player
 Sadie Sink (born 2002), actress
 Darden Smith (born 1962), songwriter, musician
 Courtland Sutton (born 1995), professional football player (Denver Broncos 2018–current)
 Gary Weiss (born 1955), former shortstop for the Los Angeles Dodgers
 Wilson Whitley (1955–1992), professional football player

See also

History of the Jews in Brenham, Texas
National Register of Historic Places listings in Washington County, Texas
Brenham Heritage Museum

References

External links

City of Brenham Web Site

Economic Development Foundation of Brenham

 
Cities in Texas
Cities in Washington County, Texas
County seats in Texas
Micropolitan areas of Texas